Chia Pets are American styled terracotta figurines used to sprout chia, where the chia sprouts grow within a couple of weeks to resemble the animal's fur or hair. Moistened chia seeds (Salvia hispanica) are applied to a grooved terracotta figurine.

The Chia Pet is marketed by Joe Pedott and produced by San Francisco, California-based company Joseph Enterprises, Inc. He originally developed the idea for Chia Pets after visiting Mexico and seeing Oaxacan artisans using sprouted chia seeds in their artwork. The first Chia Pet was created on September 8, 1977. A trademark registration was filed on Monday, October 17, 1977. Pedott first learned about "something called the Chia Pet" being imported from Mexico when he attended a housewares show in Chicago in 1977. Negotiating the rights, Pedott began marketing Chia Pets in the US. They achieved popularity in the 1980s following the 1982 release of a ram, the first widely distributed Chia Pet.

The catchphrase sung in the TV commercial as the plant grows in time lapse is "Ch-ch-ch-chia!". This catchphrase originated at an agency brainstorming meeting, where one of the individuals present pretended to stutter the product name. As of 2019, approximately 15 million Chia Pets were sold annually with most sales during the holiday season. Originally made in Mexico, Chia Pets are now produced in China.

A range of generic animals has been produced, including a turtle, pig, puppy, kitten, frog, and hippopotamus. Cartoon characters have also been licensed, including Garfield, Scooby-Doo, Looney Tunes, Shrek, The Simpsons, and SpongeBob. Additionally, there are Chia Pets depicting real people, including Barack Obama and Bob Ross.

Joseph Enterprises sells replacement seeds for Chia products and also sells chia seeds in bulk as a nutritional supplement.

References

External links 

 Official Chia Pet website
 A look at a Chia Pet growing in pictures

1980s fads and trends
Garden features
Products introduced in 1977
Terracotta